George Morrell may refer to:

 George Morrell (football manager) (c. 1872–?), Scottish football manager of Arsenal FC
 George Herbert Morrell (1845–1906), English politician and lawyer
 George Truman Morrell (1830–1912), British naval officer and explorer
 George Morrell (racing driver) in 1975 Hardie Ferodo 1000
 George Morrell (actor) in His Brother's Ghost

See also
 George Morell (disambiguation)